Nagore Robles Gutiérrez (Basauri, Vizcaya, February 10, 1983) is a Spanish television presenter and collaborator who rose to prominence after her participation in the reality show Gran Hermano. Since then, she has participated in various television programs, mainly developing her career within the Mediaset España group.

Biography 

Born in Basauri en 1983, Nagore entered the casting of Gran Hermano in 2009, in its eleventh edition, where she was the fourth expelled with the highest percentage in the history of the reality show in Spain, 95%. The success of that edition made the network count on Nagore for future television projects, making him a regular in the debates of Gran Hermano, Supervivientes and other television formats of Telecinco.

In 2011, she joined the cast of contestants of Acorralados: perdidos en el bosque, where she was the winner. Her work in television increased after that, particularly in places like De buena ley. She also co–wrote a book with the members of Bolleras Viajeras entitled Siete Tentaciones. In subsequent years, she signed on as a collaborator on El programa de Ana Rosa in 2012 and as a love advisor on Mujeres y hombres y viceversa in 2013, where she remained until its cancellation in 2021. In the dating show, she became the presenter during Toñi Moreno's maternity leave between 2019 and 2020.

In 2017, she competed in the imitation talent show Me lo dices o me lo cantas on Telecinco, where she participated in Cristina Rodríguezs team, being the finalist of said team. A year later, she participated in the celebrity culinary talent show Ven a cenar conmigo: Gourmet edition. She also continued to host talk shows in Gran Hermano VIP, La casa fuerte and El debate de las tentaciones.

Several media outlets and written press consider her to be one of Spain's most influential LGTBI people. In advertising, she has participated in the Mediaset España campaign to promote collective awareness against the spread of COVID-19. She also participated in the first national campaign of the social network Tinder in Spain.

In 2021, she premiered her first program of her own as a presenter, Sobreviviré, on Mitele (Mediaset España), a social debate–type program produced by Bulldog TV. The program was renewed for a second season after the success of the first, becoming a daily program.

In March 2022, she began presenting the dating show Baila conmigo on Cuatro.

Private life 
In September 2011, coinciding with Nagore's participation in Acorralados, her relationship with the DJ and daughter of Bárbara Rey, Sofía Cristo, became public.  In early 2013, they made their breakup public.

In 2016 he begins a romantic relationship with journalist and writer Sandra Barneda that ended in 2022.

Trajectory

Published works

References

External links 
 Nagore Robles on Instagram

People from Basauri
Spanish lesbian actresses
Living people
Spanish television personalities
Spanish television actresses
1983 births